Malachi is an unincorporated place and community in Unorganized Kenora District in northwestern Ontario, Canada. It is also the name of the surrounding geographic township. The community is almost exclusively situated on the shores of Malachi Lake.

Malachi railway station is in the community. The station is on the Canadian National Railway transcontinental main line between Copelands Landing to the west and Ottermere to the east, has a passing track, and is served by Via Rail transcontinental Canadian trains.

References

Communities in Kenora District